Bubai Singh  is an Indian footballer who plays as a goalkeeper for Mohun Bagan in the I-League.

Career

Air India
Singha made his debut for Air India FC on 10 February 2013 against reigning champions Dempo. He managed to let in only one Dempo goal and Air India won 2–1.

Career statistics

Club
Statistics accurate as of 12 May 2013

References

External links 
 

Living people
I-League players
Association football goalkeepers
Indian footballers
Air India FC players
Year of birth missing (living people)